Villel is a municipality located in the province of Teruel, Aragon, Spain. , the municipality has a population of 366 inhabitants.

Villel is home to a ruined medieval castle. It is the birthplace of 19th-century statesman Francisco Tadeo Calomarde.

References

Municipalities in the Province of Teruel